Staggerford is Jon Hassler's first novel, published in 1977.

Named for its setting in a quaint, mid-western small town, Staggerford is told mainly from the point of view of seasoned English teacher Miles Pruitt, a bachelor, age 35.  Employing a third-person narration sometimes omniscient, sometimes limited, the novel chronicles the daily life, memories, and insights of the competent but ironic Miles, along with those of a handful of his colleagues, friends, and students, during a single, increasingly eventful week, starting on Friday October 30 and ending on Saturday November 7. Passing references to the American Indian Movement (265) place the action firmly in the mid-1970s.  By turns poignant and humorous, the novel affectionately satirizes academia and the narrowness of American small-town life while sympathizing with the struggles and successes of a wide variety of "ordinary" people.

1977 American novels
Novels set in schools
Atheneum Books books